Black, White & Blue is a 2018 American documentary film directed by Asia Norris and produced by Curtis Scoon. The film covers the history of race related issues in America and features Michigan Senator Coleman Young II, television personality Charlamagne tha God, rapper Killer Mike and Lord Jamar from Brand Nubian.

Black, White & Blue premiered at the Sundance Film Festival, on January 19, 2018.

Synopsis
Black, White & Blue discusses the history of race related issues in America in one-on-one interviews with notable African-American's, including: Michigan Senator Coleman Young II, Baltimore Circuit Court Judge William "Billy" Murphy Jr., journalist Touré, author Michael Eric Dyson, Detroit News reporter James David Dickson, activist Ibrahim Hooper, rapper Killer Mike, Lord Jamar from Brand Nubian, former NYPD Officer Michael Dowd, along with interviews with the “man on the street” and visuals from across the country.

Topics discussed in the documentary include: the Black Lives Matter Movement, the Flint Water Crisis, and violence between law enforcement and citizens.

References

External links
 
 

2018 films
Films about race and ethnicity
Films about racism
Films set in Detroit
Documentary films about African Americans
American documentary films
2010s English-language films
2010s American films